Maximilian Hirsch (21 September 1852? – 4 March 1909) was a German-born businessman and economist who settled in Melbourne, Australia, where he became the recognized intellectual leader of the Australian Georgist movement and, briefly, a member of the Victorian Parliament.

Early life
Hirsch was born in Cologne in the German state of Prussia on 21 September, the year being either 1852, as stated in newspaper reports of his death, or 1853, as stated in the biography prepared by his memorial committee.  His father was a writer on economic subjects, and a member of the Reichstag who ran into trouble with the German authorities due to his democratic principles. Young Hirsch was educated at a high school and also did some work at the University of Berlin, but aged 19 began a career as a commercial traveller. Before he was 20 he was sent to Persia to buy carpets and obtained many fine old specimens. These were brought to London via Russia. Hirsch spent some time in Italy studying art, and taking up his travelling again became a representative of British linen manufacturers. Hirsch visited Australia in 1879, and in the following year returned to Germany. Hirsch next went to Ceylon and engaged in coffee planting and was also for a time a member of the civil service. While in Ceylon he found that the rice tax was driving native cultivators off the land. His sympathies were aroused and he wrote several pamphlets on the question, which led to the removal of the tax.

Career in Australia

By 1890, Hirsch had become convinced by the "Single Tax" theory of Henry George.  In that year he settled in Melbourne, capital of the Australian colony of Victoria, and became a founding member of the Victorian Single Tax League, of which he was to serve as president for a total of about ten years. In 1892 he gave up business to devote himself to the twin causes of free trade and land value taxation.  This decision gave him time for writing. His early works included The Fiscal Superstition (published in 1895), and Economic Principles: A Manual of Political Economy (1896). These were followed in 1901 by Social Conditions: Materials for Comparisons between New South Wales and Victoria, Great Britain, United States and Foreign Countries.

Hirsch's largest and most acclaimed work, Democracy versus Socialism, was published by Macmillan in London, also in 1901.  Its short title declares its emphasis but understates its scope.  The work anticipates Ludwig von Mises in its coverage of both the economic and political aspects of socialism, and in predicting that socialism would lead to tyranny by depriving public policy of objective points of reference.  But it also contains the most complete statement of Hirsch's economic doctrine.  In lieu of Henry George's theory of interest (based on the productive and reproductive capabilities of capital), it establishes the compatibility of the Austrian theory of capital and interest with the Georgist theory of land and rent.  In Pt.II, Ch.VIII, it proposes a correction to David Ricardo's Law of Rent.  The traditional formulation of this law states that the rent of land is the advantage of using that land relative to the advantage of using the best land that can be had for no rent, given the same application of labour and capital.  Hirsch argued that the proper basis of comparison was not the same application, but the optimal application in each case. He believed that Ricardo's mistake accounted for the mistaken acceptance of Malthusianism and social Darwinism.

In Melbourne in July and August 1904, Hirsch gave a series of three public lectures against socialism.  These were subsequently published as a pamphlet by Francis Neilson, who wrote in his introduction: "No sounder, no fairer analysis of the proposals and conceptions of socialism is to be found in the literature on the subject."

Hirsch made several attempts to enter political life without success, but in 1902 was elected to the Victorian Legislative Assembly for Mandurang (near Bendigo, Victoria). Hirsch resigned this seat in November 1903 to contest the Wimmera constituency in the Federal house of representatives as the fiscal question was now purely a federal matter. However, Hirsch was defeated by 160 votes by the incumbent Protectionist Party member, Pharez Phillips. Hirsch had become the recognized leader of the single tax movement, and his ability in both handling this question in public debates and in his writings brought him many supporters. In his fight for free trade, then a live question in Australia, Hirsch met with much hostility from vested interests, and his opponents did not forget to remind the public that he was German and a Jew. It was even suggested that he was opposed to reasonable wages being paid to the workers. This was quite contrary to the facts, as Hirsch was essentially democratic in his views, and held strongly that the higher the wages paid the better for trade. In 1906 he again failed to win the election for Wimmera. In October 1908 Hirsch left Melbourne on a business mission to Siberia. His health had not been good and it was hoped that the sea voyage would benefit him. Hirsch died at Vladivostok after a short illness on 4 March 1909. He never married.

Land Values Taxation in Practice, a survey by Hirsch of recent legislative reforms in multiple jurisdictions, was substantially completed by 1908, but was published posthumously in 1910.  A collection of Hirsch's shorter writings, under the title The Problem of Wealth and Other Essays, was published as a memorial volume in 1911.

Legacy
Friends of Hirsch considered that had he would have become a rich man if he had devoted himself entirely to business. He was, however, devoted to his ideals, and preferred to work for causes which could bring him little personal reward but which would be for the good of the people. He was a clear and vigorous writer and speaker, keenly logical, careful of his facts, and always prepared to meet the difficulties of his case. He was no revolutionist, and stated on one occasion that if he were appointed dictator he would bring in the single tax system gradually, so that people who had acquired property under the present system should not be unfairly treated.

Democracy versus Socialism went into a second edition in England in 1924.  When the third American edition appeared in 1940, Albert Jay Nock wrote in the Atlantic Monthly:

Notes
  “Mr Max Hirsch dies at Vladivostok”, The Herald (Melbourne), 4 March 1909 (not 1st Ed.).
  “Death of Mr. Max Hirsch.”  The Advertiser (Adelaide), 5 March 1909, p. 7.
  "About People", The Age (Melbourne), 5 March 1909, p. 5.
  “Death of Mr. Max Hirsch.”  The Argus (Melbourne), 5 March 1909, p. 4.
  Max Hirsch, The Problem of Wealth and other essays, Memorial Volume (Melbourne, 1911), pp. 9–23 (Preface).
  Max Hirsch, Democracy versus Socialism, 4th Ed. (New York: Robert Schalkenbach Foundation, 1948), pp.xi–xx (Preface to 2nd Ed., June 1924).
  Airlie Worrall, The New Crusade: the Origins, Activities and Influence of the Australian Single Tax Leagues, 1889–1895 (M.A. thesis, University of Melbourne, 1978).
  "Mr. Max Hirsch", Progress (Melbourne), March 1909, Second Edition, pp. 1–2.
  Max Hirsch, An Analysis of the Proposals and Conceptions of Socialism (New York: B.W. Huebsh, Inc., 1920).

References

 Percival Serle, "Hirsch, Max (c.1852–1909)", Dictionary of Australian Biography (Sydney: Angus and Robertson, 1949); retrieved 2 January 2010.
 Airlie Worrall, "Hirsch, Maximilian (1852?–1909)", Australian Dictionary of Biography (Melbourne University Press, 1983), vol.9, pp. 308–309; Online Ed. retrieved 2 January 2010.

External links
 What Determines the Value of Land by Max Hirsch, at The School of Cooperative Individualism
 Democracy versus Socialism by Max Hirsch, at the Open Library
 Newspaper Report on a Lecture By Max Hirsch

1852 births
1853 births
1909 deaths
Australian economists
German emigrants to Australia
Georgist economists
Land value taxation
Australian Jews